RMAF Labuan is an air force base operated by the Royal Malaysian Air Force. It is located in Labuan, Sabah in East Malaysia. It is colocated with the Labuan Airport.

History
  
RMAF Labuan started with the deployment of one detachment of the Royal Air Force, under the command of Group Captain S.J. Rawling. After the formation of Malaysia on 16 September 1963, some personnel were deployed to this airbase under the Air Force Borneo. At that early time, RMAF Labuan owned some Twin Pioneer aircraft for logistic and patrol role. The Indonesia–Malaysia confrontation in 1963 aroused the demand for this airbase to be upgraded as a main airbase for Malaysia. From 1965, RMAF Labuan saw a significant upgrade with the formation of the main administration branch, the expansion of the existing detachment, the formation of a new squadron and the commissioning of new aircraft. In 1966, RMAF Labuan received its first batch of DHC-4 Caribou to strengthen the No 8 Squadron that already operated Twin Pioneer transport aircraft. The No 5 Squadron that formed in Kuala Lumpur also moved to the RMAF Labuan with their Aérospatiale Alouette III helicopters to provide a rotorcraft element. RMAF Labuan was inaugurated by the defence minister at the time, in 1968. Nowadays, RMAF Labuan is an important airbase for the RMAF as it grants direct access to the South China Sea and protects Borneo's East Malaysia. RMAF Labuan is now the base of the RMAF's BAE Hawk 108 and BAE Hawk 208.

See also

 Royal Malaysian Air Force bases
 List of airports in Malaysia

References

Buildings and structures in Labuan
Royal Air Force stations of World War II in British Malaya